Pays d'Aix Football Club, also known as Aix FC is a French association football club based in the city of Aix-en-Provence. The team was founded in 1941 as a merger of Football Club Aixois and Union Sportive Aixoise football clubs. Their best result was playing in French Division 1 in the 1967–68 season, where they finished bottom. Four years later they were further relegated to third level. They spent the following four decades playing in lower level amateur levels. In 2014, the club was renamed from AS Aix to Pays d'Aix FC to mark a rupture with the club's complicated past. As of the 2019–20 season, Pays d'Aix currently play in Provence Départemental 3 in the tenth tier of the French league system.

Recent Championship seasons

Managerial history

Notable players 

 Joseph Alcazar
 Gunnar Andersson
 Jean Baratte
  Ivan Bek
 Bruno Bini
 Rubén Bravo
 Caju
 Georges Carnus
 Lucien Cossou
 René Exbrayat
 Raoul Giraudo
 Cyril Granon
 Henri Guérin
 Erik Kuld Jensen
 Gunnar Johansson
 Jean-Louis Leonetti
 Jean Luciano
 Yannick Makota
 Sébastien Maté
 Henri Michel
 Aimé Mignot
 Roland Mitoraj
 Éric Mura
 Rachid Natouri
 Kurt Nielsen
 Robert Péri
 Christian Peyron
 Jean Prouff
 Roger Rolhion
 Jean-Pierre Teisseire
 André Travetto
 Joseph Ujlaki
 Joël Wakanumuné

References

External links 
 History

 
Aix-en-Provence
Sport in Bouches-du-Rhône
1941 establishments in France
Aix
Ligue 1 clubs
Football clubs in Provence-Alpes-Côte d'Azur